Shaul Shani (born c. 1955) is an Israeli businessman in the technology industry, and the owner of Swarth Group.

Early life
Shaul Shani was born circa 1955. He grew up in Kiryat Eliezer, Haifa. His father worked at the Port of Haifa

Career
Shani started investing in the 1980s. He founded Oshap Technologies in 1982. It was listed on the NASDAQ three years later, in 1985. By 1999, he sold it to SunGard for US$210 million. He was also a co-founder of Sapiens International Corporation and Tecnomatix, two companies listed on the NASDAQ which he later sold.

He founded Global Village Telecom, a Brazilian telecommunications company, in 1999. Upon selling it to Vivendi for US$4.5 billion in 2009, he made a profit of US$1.5 billion.

He is the owner of Swarth Group, which controls ECI Telecom.

In May 2015, his net worth was estimated at US$3.0 billion. As of February 2022, Forbes listed his net worth at $4.1 billion.

Personal life
Shani resides in Italy.

References

Living people
People from Petah Tikva
Israeli investors
Israeli company founders
Israeli billionaires
Year of birth missing (living people)